"I'm on Fire" is a song written and performed by American rock performer Bruce Springsteen. Released in 1985, it was the fourth single from his album Born in the U.S.A.

History
"I'm on Fire" was first recorded in January 1982 during the first wave of Born in the U.S.A. sessions, but the album version and the single was cut on May 11, 1982, at The Power Station. This took place in impromptu fashion when Springsteen started making up a slow tune on guitar for some lyrics he had, some of which had been written for "Spanish Eyes", which would later surface on The Promise, and drummer Max Weinberg and keyboardist Roy Bittan, hearing it for the first time, created an accompaniment on the spot.  The result was a moody number that merges a soft rockabilly beat, lyrics built around sexual tension, and synthesizers into an effective whole; it was one of the first uses of that instrument in Springsteen's music.

Cash Box said that the song is "at once a quiet and tense tune of pent up desire."

The song peaked at No. 6 on the Billboard Hot 100 pop singles charts in early 1985.  It was the fourth of a record-tying seven Top 10 hit singles to be released from Born in the U.S.A. The single also reached No. 1 in the Netherlands for 3 weeks in July and August 1985, while two other Springsteen singles ("Dancing in the Dark" and "Born in the U.S.A.") were also in the top ten. This marked the first time for an artist to have as many as three singles inside the Dutch top ten since the Beatles did so in 1965.

Music video
The music video for the song was shot in March 1985 in Los Angeles, and was directed by filmmaker John Sayles.  Unlike the previous videos from the album, the video was not a performance clip, but rather a dramatic interpretation of the song's themes.

In it, Springsteen plays a working class automobile mechanic with an attractive, married, very well-to-do, mostly unseen female customer who brings her vintage Ford Thunderbird in for frequent servicing, always requesting that he does the work.  She leaves a small bunch of keys with him when she leaves in her car, possibly including house keys implying that she wishes to start an affair with him, but declines his offer to bring the car out to her house when it's ready.  Later that night, he drives the car up to her mansion high in the hills above the city.  He looks to a second floor window with the light on and is about to ring the bell, when he thinks better of it and drops her keys in the mailbox next to the door.  He smiles wistfully and walks away down towards the city lights below.

The video began airing in mid-April, received extensive MTV airplay, and later in the year won the MTV Video Music Award for Best Male Video.

Track listing
 "I'm on Fire" – 2:36
 "Johnny Bye Bye" (Springsteen, Chuck Berry) – 1:50

The B-side of the single, "Johnny Bye Bye" - Just before he was sentenced to three years for violating the Mann Act in 1962, Chuck Berry wrote "Bye Bye Johnny", a sequel to "Johnny B. Goode", where a mother sent her musician son off to Hollywood to be a star. "She drew out all her money from the Southern Trust, and put her little boy aboard the Greyhound Bus." It was not a big hit for Berry, but Springsteen decided to use those lines in 1981, for a new song that used most of the lyrics from "Come On Let's Go Tonight", calling it "Johnny Bye-Bye". Springsteen had first started performing it in 1981 at the tail end of The River Tour.  It was then recorded in April 1982 during the "Electric Nebraska" sessions. The official version was recorded on January 4, 1983, at Thrill Hill West, Los Angeles, CA, and one of the mixes was released on February 6, 1985, as the B-side to "I'm On Fire". The song appeared on preliminary song lists for inclusion on what would become Born in the U.S.A. but was ultimately left off the final album.

Live performance history
"I'm on Fire" was performed only sporadically at the start of the Born in the U.S.A. Tour, but a couple of months later, it settled into a regular place in the middle of the second set.  It was usually preceded by a long musical introduction, during which Springsteen spoke about not being able to sleep at night when he was young and his parents were struggling and the house was cold.  The song was also given an extended coda of Springsteen's moans against waves of synthesizer.  Such a rendition from an August 19, 1985, performance at Giants Stadium is included on the Live/1975-85 box set, but with the spoken part of the introduction edited out.

In some cases, red lighting from stage floor focused on Springsteen's face was used to further accentuate the song.  On the Tunnel of Love Express, the song was still a regular.  On the Human Rights Now! Tour, Springsteen conducted crowd sing-alongs during the chorus and coda parts.  After some appearances on the "Other Band" Tour, the song went into a long retirement, not emerging again until occasional performances on 2005's solo Devils & Dust Tour, when he performed it on banjo with the red lighting back.

Between 1999 and 2008, the song was only performed on eight occasions with the E Street Band: once on the Reunion Tour (June 17, 1999, Bremen), once on The Rising Tour (April 18, 2003, Ottawa) and six times on the Magic Tour. The song has made surprise return on a semi-regular basis during the European leg of the 2009 Working on a Dream tour. As of November 2009, it has been performed live 245 times.

Personnel
According to authors Philippe Margotin and Jean-Michel Guesdon:

Bruce Springsteen – vocals, guitar
Roy Bittan – keyboard
Max Weinberg – drums

Live cover performances
Dixie Carter covered this song on her 1985 album, Come a Little Closer. The album was re-released posthumously under Heart of Dixie in 2013. 
Waylon Jennings covered the song on his 1986-album Sweet Mother Texas
Big Country included a recorded live cover of the song on their 1996 album Eclectic.
Tori Amos covered the song in concert and on the television program and CD release VH1 Crossroads in 1996.
Johnny Cash covered the song and it appeared on the 2000 album Badlands: A Tribute to Bruce Springsteen's Nebraska.
Heather Nova is known to perform a folk style cover of the song at her live shows, often at the end of the set. It can be heard as the last track of her 2000 live album Wonderlust. She also performed the song as a duet with Sarah McLachlan during Lilith Fair.
Philip Quast performed part of the song with "Every Breath You Take" in 2002, as part of his "Live at the Donmar" showcase and subsequent album.
Electrelane has covered the song live. It appears as a B-side on the "On Parade" single and their 2006 compilation album Singles, B-Sides & Live.
Bat For Lashes also covered the song live and included it as a bonus track on her 2006 debut album Fur and Gold.
Jack's Mannequin did a cover of the song for AP on April 10, 2007, and have covered the song at numerous live shows.
Matt Andersen performed this song on his live album Live at Liberty Hotel. This album was recorded in 2007.
Whitey Morgan and the 78's recorded and released a country version of the song in 2008.
Sara Bareilles covered this song in April 2009 when she was in New York City for her three shows at Joe's Pub during her Gravity tour. It was consequently included on a 7-song live EP from this tour, distributed for free in early 2010 via her website.
John Mayer covered the song as a bonus track from the 2009 album Battle Studies.
Ben Harper and Jennifer Nettles performed the song in tribute at the 2009 Kennedy Center Honors.
Lindi Ortega recorded a cover of the song as a bonus track on her 2011 major label debut album Little Red Boots.
Tegan and Sara have performed part of this song as a live medley with their song "Not Tonight" at several shows in 2012 and 2013.
Barry Gibb performed it as a part of the setlist of the Mythology Tour in the US, as a thank you to Springsteen who had performed a version of "Stayin' Alive" in Brisbane, the childhood place of the brothers Gibb in Australia.
Lorde covered the song as part of a mash-up with her own song "400 Lux" in select concerts on her Melodrama World Tour in 2018.
Soccer Mommy covered the song during her "Clean" Tour in 2018.
Gang of Youths covered the song during their 2018 US Tour.Chromatics covered the song on their 2018 EP I'm On Fire, and have performed it at numerous shows on tour.
 Tanya Tucker included a live cover of the song (combined with Johnny Cash's "Ring of Fire") on her 2020 Live from the Troubadour album.
Noah Thompson, American Idol 2022 winner, sang the song on the season finale.
Marissa Nadler also covered the song during numerous tours.
Comedian Tim Hawkins parodied the song as "The Dog's On Fire" for his 2010 DVD Insanitized.

Charts

Weekly charts

Year-end charts

Certifications

 

 

References

Works cited

 Born in the U.S.A. The World Tour (tour booklet, 1985), Tour chronology.
 Marsh, Dave.  Glory Days: Bruce Springsteen in the 1980s''.  Pantheon Books, 1987.  .

External links
 Brucebase recording sessions history

1984 songs
1985 singles
American soft rock songs
Bruce Springsteen songs
Columbia Records singles
Dutch Top 40 number-one singles
Irish Singles Chart number-one singles
MTV Video Music Award for Best Male Video
Music videos directed by John Sayles
Song recordings produced by Bruce Springsteen
Song recordings produced by Chuck Plotkin
Song recordings produced by Jon Landau
Song recordings produced by Steven Van Zandt
Songs written by Bruce Springsteen
Ultratop 50 Singles (Flanders) number-one singles